The former Norwegian Catholic diocese of Hamar existed from 1152 to 1542, when the Protestant Reformation turned it into a bishopric of the Lutheran state church. The cathedral see was at Hamar, and the diocese included the (modern) counties of Hedmark (except Solør, Odalen and the northern part of Østerdalen), Oppland (except Valdres), and the middle part of Buskerud (the traditional districts Numedal and Ringerike). It also included some parts of Telemark (the modern municipalities of Hjartdal, Notodden, Seljord, Tinn and Vinje).

History 
It was formed in 1152 out of the diocese of Oslo, when Arnold, Bishop of Garðar, Greenland (1124–1152), was appointed first Bishop of Hamar. He began to build the now ruined cathedral of Christ Church, which was completed about the time of Bishop Paul (1232–1252).

Bishop Thorfinn (1278–1282) was exiled and died at Ter Doest Cistercian Abbey in Lissewege, Flanders. Bishop Jörund (1285–1286) was transferred to the archdiocese of Trondhjem. A provincial council was held in 1380.

The last Catholic bishop, Mogens Lauritssøn (1513–1537), was taken prisoner in his castle at Hamar by Truid Ulfstand, a Danish noble, and sent to Antvorskov in Denmark, where he was held until his death in 1542. There were at Hamar a cathedral chapter with ten canons, a school, a Dominican Priory of St. Olaf, and a monastery of the Canons Regular of St. Anthony of Vienne.

Episcopal ordinaries
(all Roman Rite; possibly incomplete)
Suffragan Bishops of Hamar 
 Arnaldur (1152 – ?), previously Bishop of Garðar (Gardar) (Greenland) (1126 – 1150)
 Orm (1164? – ?)
 Ragnar (? – ?)
 Torir (? – ?)
 Ivar Skjalg (1194.06.29 – death 1221)
 Hallvard (1221 – death 1231)
 Pål (1232 – death 1251)
 Peter, Dominican Order (O.P.) (1253.03.11 – death 1260)
 Gilbert (1263.03.04 – 1275?)
 Torfinn, Cistercian Order (O. Cist.) (1278 – death 1285.01.08)
 Jørund (1286 – 1287.02.15), next Metropolitan Archbishop of Nidaros (Trondheim, Norway) (1287.02.15 – death 1309.04.11)
 Torstein (1288 – death 1304)
 Ingjald (1306 – death 1314)
 Bottolf (1318 – death 1319)
 Hallvard (1320.07.07 – death 1349)
 Olaf (? – ?)
 Håvard (1351.08 – death 1363)
 Magnus Slangestorp, O.P. (1364.05.29 – death 1380)
 Sigurd (1383 – death 1419)
 Annbjørn Sunnulvsson (1420.01.24 – ?)
 Peder Boson (1433.07.08 – death 1440?)
 Gunnar Thorgardsson (1442.06 – death 1473)
 Karl Sigurdsson  (1476.12.22 – death 1487.12.28)
 Herman Trulsson (1488.05.28 – death 1503?)
 Karl Jensson Skonk (1504– 1512)
 Mogens Lauritsson (1513–1542)

See also 
 Cathedral Ruins in Hamar
 List of Catholic dioceses in Norway

References 

Attribution
 The entry cites:
  J. M. Hansen, Hamar og dets Biskopper (Hamar and Its Bishops), Hamar: Th. A. Hansens Bogtrykkeri, 1866.  
  Chr[istian]. Ramseth, Hamars Bys Historie.  Til 50 aars jubilæt 21 Mars 1899 (History of the City of Hamar : 50th Anniversary, 21 March 1899), Hamar: L. Larsen, Axel Magnussen and H. A. Samuelsen, 1899.  
  Christian C[hristoph]. A[ndreas]. Lange, De norske Klostres Historie i Middelaldern, Anden omarbeidede Udgave (The History of the Norwegian Monasteries in the Middle Ages, Second Revised Edition), Christiania [now Oslo]: Chr. Tønsbergs Forlag, 1856, pages 374-77 and 389–391; Historisk Tidsskrift (Historical Journal), 3rd series, Volume I, Christiania, 1890, pages 113–140, 244–269, 277–334; Volume III, Christiania, 1895, pages 379–411.

Hamar
Hamar
History of Hamar
Christianity in medieval Norway
1152 establishments in Europe
12th-century establishments in Norway
Organisations based in Hamar